Jacob Gill "Jake" Gaudaur, Sr. (3 April 1858 – 11 October 1937) was one of two Canadians to win the Professional World Sculling Championship. Gaudaur was born in Orillia, Ontario. His first race was when he was aged 17 years and over his career he raced more than two hundred times. His professional career started in 1880.

Pre-championship races
Gaudaur first came to notice when he beat Edward Trickett, the former World Champion, in England in 1881. He was trained by another former World Champion Ned Hanlan and on May 30, 1887 managed to beat him in a race at New York. In 1891 Jake came second in the Hop Bitters Race. In 1892 he teamed with George H. Hosmer to win the World Double Sculls Championship. The year of 1893 saw him win the three miles race for the American Single Sculls Championship in a record time of 19m.06s. After this he offered to row any person in the world for the American Championship or for any race between a quarter and three miles for a stake of between $1000 and $2500. The following year he reduced the record time to 19m.01.5s in the same event. When he won the Championship for a third rime he was given permanent possession of the prize, the Richard K Fox Trophy. The convention of the times was that consecutive three-time winners in most sports kept the prize as their own property. After this Gaudaur was sometimes referred to in the press as "American" rather than "Canadian." The year 1885 was a most successful year for Gaudaur—of fifteen races he competed in he was only beaten in three.

In 1886, he challenged Bill Beach for the World Title. The match was run on 18 September 1886 on the Championship Course in England. This was one of the more interesting races for the Championship. The whole of the course was fringed with excited spectators several rows deep. The contestants went away fast and this exhausted Beach who stopped rowing and it seemed he was beaten. Gaudaur went ahead but Beach being cheered on by his supporters made another effort but did not catch his opposition. His coach then gave a strong encouragement to go on as he thought Gaudaur was just about "rowed out," which proved true. Gaudaur also stopped rowing and slumped in his boat for a short time before continuing. Despite another stop from exhaustion Beach then managed to row on reasonably strongly to cross the line ahead of the challenger.

World champion
By 1896 Jim Stanbury was the then World Champion. Stanbury had won the Title in Sydney in 1891 and had held off a couple of challenges in Australia in 1892. He travelled to North America and had hoped to meet Gaudaur for a match but terms could not be agreed so he returned home. Later he headed to England where he defeated Charles R. Harding on the Thames. After this it was arranged that Gaudaur would finally row Stanbury for the Title. It would have been easier for Gaudaur to travel to England rather than Australia for a match as normally the challenger travelled to where the Champion resided. The race was set down for the 7 September 1896 and was to be raced on the Thames, on the famous Championship Course (Putney to Mortlake.) The stake was for the extraordinary sum of £1000 a side. Gaudaur's physical details were given at this time as; height 6 ft, weight 12.5 st, chest 41 inches, or more. He was said to have a powerful body and well-developed limbs.

The weather was dull and a slight breeze was blowing. Thousands of people lined the banks of the river to witness the event and great enthusiasm was displayed. Stanbury won the toss and chose the Surrey side and after twelve false starts the men got away. For a half mile the boats were level but a short time later Gaudaur was almost clear ahead. At the mile post, reached in 4m.52s, he had a whole length advantage. At Hammersmith Bridge Stanbury made a desperate effort to catch the Canadian and nearly did so but a foul occurred. Stanbury believed he had been fouled by Gaudaur and stopped rowing at speed assuming that he had won the race on the foul. Gaudaur continued on and crossed the line some twenty lengths ahead. The Champion's claim to the alleged foul was disallowed by the umpire and thus Jake Gaudaur was declared World Champion. Stanbury was severely criticized for not completing the race at speed and the question of who was the better sculler was not clearly settled. The winner's time was 23m.01s for the four and a quarter mile course. The race also doubled as the English Sculling Championship as the Sportsman Challenge Cup was also at stake. National titles were not always held by residents of the country. It appears Gaudaur never defended that title.
When Gaudaur returned home to Orillia he was given a parade and reception, complete with fireworks, and the Mayor presented him with a purse containing $500 in gold.

Defending the title
In July 1897, an Australian, James Wray, offered to row Gaudaur for the Championship and £500 a side. As the proposed race was to be on the Thames, Gaudaur thought this to be far too low and suggested $2000 a side plus $500 expenses. However he was prepared to let Wray have similar expenses if the match was to be in Canada. Negotiations stalled and no race took place. Over the five years Gaudaur held the Title he never seemed to be very keen to defend it.

A challenge came from fellow Canadian, Robert M Johnston. The stake was to total $2500 and the race was to be sculled on Vancouver Harbour on 4 July 1898. This was the first Championship race to be held in Canada. (Hanlan had rowed all his twelve races out of Canada.) There were three unusual features to this Title race. One, that it was on a harbour – most such races occurred on rivers. Secondly, the course was three miles and with a 180 degree turn in the middle. Normally races were on a straightaway, or at least in one direction on a river. The 'out and return' type of race was common in North America. Thirdly, the race was started by a starter rather than by mutual consent.

At the gun Gaudaur got away first and was soon a length ahead. He continued to increase his lead and at the mile point was five lengths clear. However, in turning at the buoy Johnston steered better and gained three lengths. Gaudaur then went ahead again and despite a good final spurt by Johnston, the Champion crossed the line about four lengths ahead. The time was 20m.25.8s.

Another strange feature of this race is that despite good evidence to the contrary it is seldom listed in records of the Championship races. For example, the British Rowing Almanac of 1930 does not mention it although all other races are listed. Perhaps the race was overlooked and the error perpetuated as lists were copied from one publication to another.

Final championship race
In November 1899 Gaudaur expressed a wish to retire. He apparently declined to row George Towns of Australia who had offered to row anyone in the world, but Gaudaur preferred, for up to £1000 on the Thames. Gaudaur proposed handing the Title to another Canadian. He must have thought better of it and then accepted a proper challenge for the Title from Towns. The match was agreed to be sculled on 7 September 1901 and it was to take place at Lake of the Woods, Ontario. This was the first time a Championship race took place on a lake. The next was in 1933.

Thousands of spectators witnessed the race. The water was calm and he weather favourable. Gaudaur had the inside and better position but it was not to help him. Towns shot ahead at the start but the Champion was soon on even terms. However Towns was the stronger of the two and then went ahead to cross the line by four lengths. The time was 20m.30s, a slower time than normal.

Later life
After retiring from sculling Gaudaur became a popular and much sought-after fishing guide. No-one knew Lake Simcoe as he did.

A bridge at the Narrows, near where his home was, is called the Jake Gaudaur Bridge. Also a Historical Plaque was erected in 1960 in his memory. It is now in Centennial Park. A road in Vaughan, Ontario, Gaudaur Road, is named after him. This road runs off Hanlan Road.

Gaudaur died on October 11, 1937 at Orillia. He was inducted into the Canadian Sports Hall of Fame in 1956, and into the Orillia Hall of Fame in 1966.
Gaudaur was the father of another Jake Gaudaur—a well-known Canadian Footballer and Commissioner.

References

 The Wanganui Herald newspaper 8, 9, 11, & 12 Sep 1896, 8 Oct 1898, 6 Nov 1900, 9 Sep 1901.
 The New York Times 21 Jan 1893, 29 May 1898.
 The Victoria Daily Colonist newspaper 5 Jul 1898.
 The Evening Post newspaper 11 Sep 1886, 20 Sep 1886, 8 Jul 1897, 12 Mar 1898, 2 Jul 1898, 19 Apr 1899.
 The West Coast Times newspaper 24 Sep 1886.
 The Te Aroha Times newspaper 2 Oct 1886.
 Seven Australian World Champion Scullers, published 2010.
 Championship Rowing History
 Canadian Sports Hall of Fame
 Orillia Hall of Fame

1858 births
1937 deaths
Rowers from Ontario
Canadian male rowers
People from Orillia
Professional rowers